Natalia Noemi "Teddy" Sinclair (née Cappuccini; born 15 August 1986) is an English singer, songwriter and actress. She has recorded music under various aliases, most famously as Natalia Kills and Verbalicious. She is currently the lead vocalist of the band Cruel Youth, which also releases music under the name The Powder Room.

As Natalia Kills, Sinclair released the studio albums Perfectionist (2011) and Trouble (2013). In 2014 she married fellow singer Willy Moon. Since July 2015 Sinclair has gone by and performed under her legal name Teddy Sinclair. In 2016 she started her own band, Cruel Youth, with whom she has released the EP, +30mg (2016).

Her biggest commercial singles were the BVMI gold-certified singles "Mirrors" (2010), "Free" with Will.i.am, and the UK-top 40 hit, "Champagne Showers" with American pop duo LMFAO. She has additionally written songs for Angel Haze, Madonna, and Rihanna. She received a Grammy Award nomination in 2017 for co-writing Rihanna's single "Kiss It Better".

In March 2015 Sinclair and her husband, Willy Moon, were fired as judges from New Zealand X Factor for their harsh comments towards one of the contestants.

Life and career

1986–2010: Early life and career beginnings
Sinclair was born Natalia Noemi Cappuccini in Bradford, West Yorkshire, to a British father of Afro-Jamaican heritage and a Uruguayan mother, and attended Bradford Girls' Grammar School. Her family left Bradford when she was a child and she spent her early years traveling between England, Jamaica and Spain.

She ran away from home when she was 14 and shifted her focus away from acting. She has described her teenage years as "degenerate," stating that she tried to set her ex-boyfriend's house on fire while both were in it. She had frequent legal trouble and periodically experienced suicidal depression. She was also briefly involved with a religious cult.

She began pursuing a music career and had a significant breakthrough as "Candy Rapper" in 2003, when she won a BBC Radio 1 MC Battle in Leeds. 'Next Big Me,' released under the name Verbalicous, was in the movie Sleepover in 2004.  She signed to the UK record company Adventures in Music and released her first single "Don't Play Nice" under the name Verbalicious in February 2005. Sinclair told W that her childhood nickname from her mother was "Verbal" because she talked and sang a lot. She adopted the name and variations of it as her stage name at some points during her career.

In 2007, while writing music for films, she posted Womannequin, a demo she produced and wrote under the name Natalia Cappuccini, to MySpace. The EP received 2 million plays on the website, and she reached the top of the unsigned artists chart. During this time, using the name Verse, she also co-wrote and appeared on "They Talk Shit About Me" by French recording artist M. Pokora and met Guillaume Doubet, who would go on to direct many of her videos, in Paris. Sinclair moved to Los Angeles in 2008. Arriving without money or a place to live, Sinclair "lived out of these motels, bumming around, trying to work with or make songs with anyone who would have me for a couple of hours in the studio". At the time she says she did awful things adding "I was just trying to survive and I was too young to know better." While in L.A., a DJ introduced her to will.i.am after hearing her demo and learning that she did not have a record deal. In January 2009 will.i.am signed her to his record label, will.i.am Music Group. "We had a really good creative chemistry," she said in a 2011 Billboard interview.

2010–2014: Perfectionist, Trouble, and marriage 

Sinclair adopted the stage name Natalia Kills from the interjection "you killed it!", after her record company advised her that her legal name, "Natalia Cappuccini", was "indescribable." Kills released her debut album Perfectionist in Germany in April 2011 following the release of her first single, "Mirrors", which hit the German Top 10. The album was described as a concept album by Sinclair, claiming that everybody is a perfectionist. The album was accompanied by four singles, "Mirrors", "Wonderland", "Free" and "Kill My Boyfriend". Through 2010 and 2011 Sinclair opened for Kelis, Robyn, Kesha, Katy Perry and the Black Eyed Peas over various tours. Sinclair was featured in LMFAO's single, "Champagne Showers," and in Junior Caldera's single "Lights Out (Go Crazy)".

On 14 September 2012 Sinclair unveiled the video for "Controversy" to start promotion of her second studio album, Trouble. The album was centered on her troubled childhood. Sinclair attended an after-party for the 2013 MTV Video Music Awards, held on 25 August 2013 in Brooklyn, New York City, where she performed various songs from Trouble. Two days later, "Outta Time" was released as the album's second promotional recording free of charge in a Polydor Records newsletter, coinciding with the US release of Trouble. Trouble was officially released on 3 September 2013 as a digital download in the United States and Canada.

Sinclair married singer Willy Moon on 23 May 2014 in New York City.

2015: The X Factor New Zealand 
It was announced in late 2014 that Sinclair and Moon would be featured as judges and mentors the following year on season 2 of the New Zealand version of The X Factor, serving as the mentors of the Boys and Groups categories respectively. During the first live show, in a highly publicized scandal which Sinclair described as a "publicity stunt [she] couldn't defend [herself] against due to a wide-reaching legal gagging order", the two made scathing remarks towards contestant Joe Irvine. Sinclair described Irvine as a doppelganger over his alleged copying of Moon's hairstyle and dress sense, deeming him "cheesy" and "disgusting". The comments led to widespread condemnation on social media, including a petition to have Sinclair and Moon fired from the show, which reportedly received over 70,000 signatures within 24 hours. The show's sponsors, franchise owner and judges Melanie Blatt and Stan Walker also voiced disapproval of the incident, and Moon and Sinclair were both fired from the show the next day. Sinclair was replaced by Natalie Bassingthwaighte, a former judge on the Australian version of the show, while Moon was replaced by Shelton Woolright.

After she was fired from The X Factor, it was revealed in the media that Sinclair had left her record label, Cherrytree Records, shortly before appearing on the show. Sinclair confirmed to Billboard that while she was no longer signed to Cherrytree, she was still with Interscope Records at the time, though she later left them too.

2016–present: Cruel Youth and other ventures
In early 2016 Sinclair started a band, Cruel Youth, with her husband Moon. The band's first song, "Mr. Watson", was released on Soundcloud in February, followed by "Diamond Days" in April, which was also released on iTunes. Their third single, "Hatefuck", was released in early September, along with the release of their debut EP, +30mg, on 16 September 2016. In 2015 Sinclair also co-wrote Rihanna's song "Kiss It Better", which went on to a Grammy nomination the following year.

In 2018 Cruel Youth released the singles "Devil in Paradise" and "Portrait of a Female".

In 2020, Sinclair collaborated with Cyndi Lauper for the Apple+ TV show Central Park on a song called "Rats". 

In 2022, Sinclair and Moon received songwriting credits for "The Happiest Girl" on BLACKPINK’s Born Pink album and released the single "Mr. Badman" in 2022 as part of the soundtrack for The Invitation.

Cruel Youth are expected to release their debut album in 2023 with lead single, "Wait in the Benz".

Style and influences

Sinclair has mentioned Kate Bush and Alanis Morissette as her most important musical influences, describing them as emotional artists "who write honestly about their opinions and experiences." The singer also stated she considered Gwen Stefani, who is a musical and stylistic inspiration, as her "hero", adding that Prince, Vanity 6, and Freddie Mercury have already inspired her during live performances. Sinclair explores music that is both confessional and bold when looking for inspiration, she reveals: "I don't listen to music to let go, I listen to dive in", listing Hole, Marilyn Manson, and Eminem among her favorite artists and bands with whom she grew up. According to Jon O'Brien of AllMusic, Sinclair gradually composed a musical tone incorporating "the theatrical dance-pop of Lady Gaga, 1940s film noir, and the electro-gloom of Depeche Mode."
She also reported that she has always been a pop music fan, especially in evoking contemporary "new age" artists as Adele, Lana Del Rey, Marina and the Diamonds, Ivy Levan and Lorde.

Sinclair claims to be influenced by her own experiences. She is also inspired by cinema when writing songs. In this regard, she said in an interview for MKR Magazine: I'm a huge fan of Stanley Kubrick, Tarantino, Gaspar Noé. I love anything that's beautiful and disturbing and horrifying and gorgeous at the same time. I do get inspired, definitely. I don't listen to a lot of music except my own, but I definitely like music a lot.

Discography

 Perfectionist (2011)
 Trouble (2013)

Tours

Promotional concerts
 Perfectionist Promo Tour (2011)
 Effect Music Tour  (2013)
 Trouble Promo Tour (2013)

Co-headlining tours
 The Cherrytree Pop Alternative Tour (2011–12)

Opening act
 Kelis, Robyn – All Hearts Tour (2010)
 Robyn – Body Talk Tour (2010–11)
 The Black Eyed Peas – The Beginning Massive Stadium Tour (2011)
 Kesha – Get Sleazy Tour (2011)
 Bruno Mars – The Doo-Wops & Hooligans Tour (2011) 
 The Sounds – Something to Die For Tour (2011)
 Katy Perry – California Dreams Tour (2011)
 LMFAO – Sorry for Party Rocking Tour (2012)
 Kiiara – Low Kii Savage Tour (2016)

 Notes
This 58 dates promotional tour started on 24 June 2011 in Paris and ended on 22 November 2011 in Vancouver, Canada.
This promotional tour took place in Russia.
This promotional tour took place in the United States.
This tour was performed with other artists from the same record label.

Filmography

Awards and nominations
{| class=wikitable
|-
! Year
! Awards
! Work
! Category
! Result
|-
| 2005
| Popjustice £20 Music Prize
| "Don't Play Nice"
| Best British Pop Single
| 
|-
| 2011
| Eska Music Awards
| Herself
| International New Face
| 
|-
| 2013
| rowspan=2|MP3 Music Awards
| "Saturday Night"
| The BFV Award
| 
|-
| 2014
| "Trouble"
| The MIC Award
| 
|-
| 2017
| Grammy Awards
| "Kiss It Better"
| Best R&B Song (as songwriter)
| 
}

References

External links

Living people
1986 births
21st-century English actresses
21st-century Black British women singers
21st-century English women singers
Actresses from Bradford
Black British actresses
British actors of Latin American descent
English people of Italian descent
English people of Jamaican descent
English people of Uruguayan descent
English women songwriters
English television actresses
English women pop singers
Feminist musicians
Interscope Records artists
Musicians from Bradford
People educated at Bradford Girls' Grammar School
Polydor Records artists